Poochie or Poochy may refer to:

 Poochie (Pirates of the Caribbean), the jail dog in the film The Curse of the Black Pearl
 Poochie (The Simpsons), an anthropomorphic dog first appearing in The Itchy & Scratchy & Poochie Show
 Poochie, alias of Wardell Fouse, a Bloods gang member implicated in the murder of The Notorious B.I.G.
 Poochie (toy), a Mattel brand toy dog in the 1980s
 Poochie Puet, the stage name of a U.S. actress and singer (also known as "Poochie Puett")
 Poochy, a dog character in the Mario franchise
 Poochie, a character from the Donald Duck universe
 "Poochy", slang for chubby

See also
 Pooch (disambiguation)
 Poochi (disambiguation)
 Poo-Chi, a robot dog